Nirakazhcha is a 2010 Malayalam film directed by debutant Anish J. Karrinad starring Italian actor Vincenzo Bocciarelli, Mamta Mohandas and Manoj K. Jayan in the lead roles.

Nirakazhcha tells the story of an Italian painter who visits Kerala to recreate the magnificent Raja Ravi Varma paintings. The makers of the film claim that it is an Indo - Italian production that is expected to promote the tourism and culture of both Kerala and Italy. Accordingly, the film has been shot on some of the most scenic spots in Kerala, and would also feature the spectacular landscape of Italy.

The film is expected to have a global release and would reportedly be dubbed into Tamil, Hindi, Telugu, Kannada, Spanish, Russian, German, Arabic and Italian as well.

Cast 
 Vincenzo Bocciarelli
 Mamta Mohandas
 Manoj K. Jayan
 Jagathy Sreekumar
 Rahima
 Nicole
 Millinniala
 Libin
 Daisy Chacko
 Nedumudi Venu
 Suraj Venjarammoodu
 Vijayakumar
 Johnson Karoor

References

External links 
 
 https://www.filmibeat.com/malayalam/movies/nirakazhcha.html
 http://popcorn.oneindia.in/title/5731/nirakazhcha.html
 Vincenzo Bocciarelli

2010 films
2010s Malayalam-language films
Indian drama films